The Japanese national under-18 and under-19 basketball team represents Japan in international basketball competitions. It is administered by the Japan Basketball Association. It represents the country in international under-19 and under-18 (under age 19 and under age 18) basketball competitions.

At the 2017 FIBA Under-19 World Cup, Japan finished 10th, ahead of every competitor from FIBA Oceania, FIBA Asia and FIBA Africa.

Prominent members had been Rui Hachimura and also Kai Toews and Isaiah Murphy. Murphy played with his Japanese name Shinsaku Enomoto.

See also 
Japan national basketball team
Japan national under-17 basketball team
Japan women's national under-19 basketball team

References

Men's national under-19 basketball teams
Basketball